Luza or Luža may refer to:
 Luza (river), a river in Russia, a right tributary of the Yug
 Luza, Luzsky District, Kirov Oblast, a town in Luzsky District of Kirov Oblast, Russia
 Luža, Kočevje, former settlement in southern Slovenia
 Luža, Trebnje, a settlement in eastern Slovenia

People with the surname
Dave Luza (born 1974), Dutch improv comedian
Gustavo Luza (born 1962), former tennis player from Argentina
Lechedzani Luza (born 1978), boxer from Botswana

See also
Luza (inhabited locality), a list of inhabited localities in Russia
Luzsky (disambiguation)